Damiano Zanon (born 2 September 1983) is an Italian footballer who plays as a defender. He played over 250 league matches for both Italian clubs, Celano and Pescara.

References

External links
 Pescara Calcio profile
 

1983 births
Living people
People from L'Aquila
Footballers from Abruzzo
Association football defenders
Italian footballers
Atletico Roma F.C. players
Giulianova Calcio players
Celano F.C. Marsica players
Delfino Pescara 1936 players
Benevento Calcio players
S.S.C. Bari players
Frosinone Calcio players
Ternana Calcio players
A.C. Perugia Calcio players
Serie A players
Serie B players
Serie C players
Serie D players
U.S. Castrovillari Calcio players
Sportspeople from the Province of L'Aquila